788 Hohensteina is a main-belt asteroid discovered on 4 April 1914 by Franz Kaiser at Heidelberg-Königstuhl State Observatory. Named for castle Hohenstein located in the Taunus mountains.

References

External links 
 
 

000788
Discoveries by Franz Kaiser
Named minor planets
19140428